Amamoor is a rural town and locality in the Gympie Region, Queensland, Australia. In the  the locality of Amamoor had a population of 636 people.

Geography
The Bruce Highway passes to the east of the town and the Amamoor Forest Reserve is to the west.

Amamoor is situated on the Amamoor Creek which is a tributary of the Mary River. It is one of a chain of towns in the Mary Valley also including Imbil, Dagun, and Kandanga.

History
The town is named after a pastoral run held by J.D. McTaggart in the late 1850s. It is an Aboriginal word meaning swimming in water or a swimming creek.

When the construction of a railway line between Brisbane and Gympie was being contemplated in 1884–5, one of the routes being considered was through the Mary Valley. However, this was not the route chosen, and the residents of the valley who were disappointed at missing out on rail connection agitated for many years until the Mary Valley branch line was built. The first section south from Monkland to Kandanga (via Amamoor) was completed in October 1914 with Amamoor railway station serving the locality. The second stage to Brooloo was completed in April 1915. The final stage to Kenilworth was to be built in 1920 but was never completed.

Amamoor Post Office opened around 1920.

Amamoor State School opened on 10 October 1921. In 1949 the former Bollier State School building was relocated to Amarmoor State School. Aramoor State School was relocated to its current location in Elizabeth Street in the 1950s.

A Methodist church opened in 1935 at 9 Busby Road, later becoming Amamoor Uniting Church. It closed in 2017.

On Mother's Day 1986, six families held the first service of a newly formed Wesleyan Methodist congregation. Initially they met in a farmhouse until they purchased and converted an industrial building into the Mary Vallley Wesleyan Methodist Church.

In 1993, the services on the Mary Valley railway line were reduced, terminating at Melawondi, and the entire line was closed in 1994, ending Amamoor's rail connection.

Heritage listings 
Amamoor has heritage-listed sites, including:
 Aramoor Street: Aramoor Cream Shed at the former Aramoor railway station, one of the   Mary Valley Railway Cream Sheds
 4 Busby Street: Amamoor General Store
 10 Busby Street: Amamoor Butcher Shop
 31-33 Busby Street: Amamoor Hall
 2 Elizabeth Road: Amamoor State School

Education
Amamoor State School is a government primary (Prep-6) school for boys and girls at 2 Elizabeth Street. In 2018, the school had an enrolment of 78 students with 7 teachers (5 full-time equivalent) and 6 non-teaching staff (4 full-time equivalent).

There are no secondary schools in Amamoor. The nearest secondary school is Mary Valley State College in Imbil to the south, but it only offers secondary schooling to Year 10. For secondary schooling to Year 12, the nearest secondary school is Gympie State High School in Gympie to the north.

Amenities
Mary Valley Wesleyan Methodist Church is at 198 Amamoor Dagun Road. It is part of the Wesleyan Methodist Church of Australia.

Events
Amamoor Creek State Forest Park is host to the annual Gympie Muster, a country music festival.

Attractions
The Amamoor railway station is part of the Mary Valley Rattler.

References

External links

 

Towns in Queensland
Localities in Queensland
Gympie Region